The Association of Equipment Manufacturers (AEM) is a North American-based trade association representing off-road equipment manufacturers and suppliers, with more than 1,000 companies and more than 200 product lines in the agriculture and construction-related industry sectors worldwide. AEM is based in Milwaukee, Wisconsin.

Hall of fame
Since 1939 the group has honored leaders of the industry in their hall of fame. Some notable inductees are:

 Joseph Cyril Bamford (1916–2001), founder of JCB
 Sir Anthony Bamford  (born 1945), son of above
 Daniel Best founder of Best Manufacturing Company
 J. I. Case  (1819–1891), founder of Case Corporation
 William Dana Ewart, founder of Link-Belt Construction Equipment Company
 Ronald M. DeFeo, Terex
 Donald V. Fites, Caterpillar Inc. 
 J.C. Gorman, Gorman-Rupp Company
 John L. Grove (1921–2003), founder of Grove Manufacturing Company
 Henry Harnishfeger  (1855–1930), P&H Mining
 Benjamin Holt (1849–1920), founder of Holt Manufacturing Company
 Simon Ingersoll (1818–1894), founder of Ingersoll Rock Drill Company
 R. G. LeTourneau (1888–1969), earthmover
 Hans Liebherr, Liebherr Group
 William Otis (1813–1839), inventor of the steam shovel

See also 
Conexpo-Con/Agg

References

Companies based in Milwaukee
Trade associations based in the United States
Manufacturing in the United States